Bertrand "Bert" Arthur Patenaude (November 4, 1909November 4, 1974) was an American soccer player who played as a forward. Although it was formerly disputed, he is officially credited by FIFA as scorer of the first hat-trick in the World Cup history. He is a member of the United States Soccer Hall of Fame.

Club career
Born in Massachusetts in 1909, Patenaude began playing in the competitive local leagues in his hometown of Fall River, Massachusetts. In 1928, he signed his first professional contract with Philadelphia Field Club of the American Soccer League. In his eight games with Philadelphia, he scored six goals. Despite this productivity, he moved to J&P Coats for one league game, then moved again to his hometown Fall River Marksmen. While playing with the Marksmen, Patenaude formed a lethal striking partnership with another local Massachusetts player, Billy Gonsalves (scoring 112 goals in 114 appearances with the Massachusetts club). He remained in Fall River until the summer of 1930, winning the 1930 National Challenge Cup before moving to the Newark Americans. He scored seven goals in five games at the start of the 1930–1931 season, but found himself back with the Marksmen for the end of the season. In 1931, Fall River merged with the New York Soccer Club to form the New York Yankees. However, Fall River had already begun playing National Cup games. Therefore, while the Yankees won the National Cup, the records show the winner as Fall River. In the cup championship, Patenaude scored five goals in the Yankees' 6–2 first game victory over Chicago's Bricklayers and Masons F.C. Patenaude remained with the Yankees through the spring of 1931. That same year, the Yankees moved to New Bedford, Massachusetts where the team took up the name of the defunct New Bedford Whalers.

The ASL was collapsing by the fall of 1931 and records are incomplete, but it appears that in 1933, Patenaude signed with the Philadelphia German-Americans of the second American Soccer League. In 1934, Patenaude moved west to sign with St. Louis Central Breweries of the St. Louis Soccer League, at that point the only professional league in the country. Central Breweries, stocked with future Hall of Famers, won the league and 1935 National Challenge Cup titles. In 1935, Central Breweries left the league, became an independent team and lost the sponsorship of the brewery. Patenaude remained with the team, now called the St. Louis Shamrocks. In 1936, the Shamrocks went to the National Cup final before falling to the Philadelphia German-Americans.

In 1936, Patenaude returned east where he played one season with Philadelphia Passon of the ASL before he disappeared from the professional scene. Patenaude returned to Fall River and worked in painting and carpentry until his death in 1974.

International career
In 1930, Patenaude was called into the U.S. national team for the 1930 FIFA World Cup. In that cup, he scored a goal in the U.S. opener against Belgium, then a hat trick in the 3–0 victory over Paraguay. Following the U.S. elimination by Argentina in the semifinals, the U.S. went on an exhibition tour of South America, ending with a 4–3 loss to Brazil in which Patenaude scored his sixth and final U.S. goal and never again appeared with the national setup.

Patenaude's record of four goals in one World Cup remains the standard for an American player. Additionally, his total stood as the all-time career mark for an American player until Landon Donovan notched his third, fourth, and fifth career World Cup goals at the 2010 edition.

World Cup hat-trick
Patenaude's historic day came on July 17, 1930, as the United States played Paraguay in the inaugural World Cup. Patenaude scored the opening goal in the tenth minute. A second goal in the fifteenth minute had been credited several different ways: as an own goal by Aurelio González (according to the RSSSF), a regular goal by the U.S.'s Tom Florie (according to the official FIFA match record), or as Patenaude's second goal (according to the United States Soccer Federation). A fiftieth-minute goal by Patenaude gave the U.S. a 3–0 win over the South Americans.

The dispute and discrepancies over the second goal had led to confusion over the first-ever World Cup hat-trick, as Argentina's Guillermo Stábile scored one against Mexico just two days after the U.S.-Paraguay game. FIFA announced on November 10, 2006, that Patenaude was the first person to score a hat-trick in World Cup play, confirming that he scored all three goals.

Patenaude was inducted into the U.S. Soccer Hall of Fame in 1971. He died in Fall River on his sixty-fifth birthday.

Career statistics
Scores and results list the United States' goal tally first, score column indicates score after each Patenaude goal.

Honors
Fall River Marksmen
American Soccer League: 1928–29, 1929, 1930
National Challenge Cup: 1930, 1931

St. Louis Central Breweries
National Challenge Cup: 1935

United States
FIFA World Cup third place: 1930

Individual
FIFA World Cup Bronze Boot: 1930
FIFA World Cup All-Star Team: 1930
U.S. Soccer Hall of Fame: 1971

References

External links
 National Soccer Hall of Fame - Player Bio
 1930 World Cup history with a U.S. team photo
 

1909 births
1974 deaths
1930 FIFA World Cup players
American people of French-Canadian descent
National Soccer Hall of Fame members
Sportspeople from Fall River, Massachusetts
Soccer players from Massachusetts
United States men's international soccer players
American Soccer League (1921–1933) players
Philadelphia Field Club players
J&P Coats players
Fall River Marksmen players
Newark Americans players
New York Yankees (soccer) players
New York Giants (soccer, 1930–1932) players
American Soccer League (1933–1983) players
Philadelphia Nationals players
Uhrik Truckers players
St. Louis Soccer League players
St. Louis Central Breweries players
St. Louis Shamrocks players
Association football forwards
American soccer players